Esperanza Guisán (23 April 1940 – 27 November 2015) was a Spanish moral and political philosopher. She was a professor at the University of Santiago de Compostela. Her work was devoted mainly to classical utilitarian theory.
A list of many of her works appears at her Google Scholar Web page, including treatises on ethics, democracy, ethics without religion, and Kant.

Writings 
In Spanish
'Los presupuestos de la falacia naturalista', 1981.
'Cómo ser un buen empirista en ética', 1985.
'', 1986.
'Esplendor y miseria de la ética kantiana', 1988.
'Manifiesto hedonista', 1990.
'La ética mira a la izquierda', 1992.
'Ética sin religión', 1993.
'Introducción a la ética', 1995.
'Más allá de la democracia', 2000.
'Una ética de libertad y solidaridad: John Stuart Mill', 2008.

In English
Taking Ethics Seriously: on the Moral and Political Theory of John Stuart Mill
Esperanza Guisán 
Telos: Revista iberoamericana de estudios utilitaristas, ISSN 1132-0877, ISSN-e 2255-596X, Vol. 14, Nº. 1, 2005, págs. 11-24

Is Griffin a millian utilitarian after all?
Esperanza Guisán 
Telos: Revista iberoamericana de estudios utilitaristas, ISSN 1132-0877, ISSN-e 2255-596X, Vol. 10, Nº. 1, 2001 (Special Issue on: Understanding Griffin), págs. 9-12

References

External links
 Tribute to Guisán, Esperanza. http://mariadario.blog/2015/11/13/saudades-sempre-esperanza-besos-a-ti-mi-maestra/
 'Un Relato Personal', an article in 'Télos' Magazine/S.I.E.U./Sociedad Iberoamericana de Estudios Utilitaristas/U.S.C. http://www.usc.es/revistas/index.php/telos/article/view/742/723 
 'Mujeres y Pensamiento en la España Actual' I. http://pendientedemigracion.ucm.es/BUCM/fsl/54718.php
 'Mujeres y Pensamiento en la España Actual' II. http://pendientedemigracion.ucm.es/BUCM/fsl/54725.php
 Interview to 'Filosofía Hoy'. http://mariadario.blog/2015/11/12/etica-a-revista-%C2%A8filosofia-hoy%C2%A8-faz-uma-entrevista-a-esperanza-guisan-universidade-de-santiago-de-compostela/
 Guisan's writings on her website at Dialnet

1940 births
2015 deaths
Spanish philosophers
Utilitarians
Spanish women philosophers
Political philosophers
Hedonism